Habib Esfahani (born 1835/1251 - 1894/1311) was an Iranian poet, grammarian and translator, who spent much of his life in exile in Ottoman Turkey.

Biography 
He was born in 1835 near Isfahan. He is also known as Habib İsfahani. The writer, who continued his primary education in Isfahan, later went to Tehran and Baghdad where he continued his education. The writer, who came to Istanbul because he was prosecuted for a political satire he wrote to Sipehsalar Mehmet Han, took refuge in the state and became an Ottoman national. Habib Mirza, under the patronage of Ahmed Vefik, gives Arabic and Persian lessons at Galatasaray High School. He died in 1891 at the age of fifty-eight.

Works
Persian Grammar
Dastur-e Sokan
Dasturca-ye Farsi
Kolasa-ye Rahnama-ye Farsi
Momaresat-e Farsiya
Rahbar-e Farsi
Barg-e sabz
Translations
Gozares-e Mardom-goriz
Gil Blas

References

19th-century Iranian poets
1835 births
1893 deaths
Iranian emigrants to the Ottoman Empire
19th-century translators
People from Chaharmahal and Bakhtiari Province
Iranian grammarians
Iranian translators